King Alfred may refer to 
Alfred the Great (871–899), King of Wessex
King Aldfrith of Northumbria (685–704/705), whose name is written "Aelfrid" in some sources
King Alfred (poem)
HMS King Alfred, multiple separate ships of the British Royal Navy named after the 9th century monarch
King Alfred Plan, the fictional CIA plan to prevent a black uprising